Manuel Baum (born 30 August 1979) is a German football manager and former player, who last coached Schalke 04.

Coaching career
Baum became head coach of SpVgg Unterhaching on 4 January 2014, after two years working as director at the club.

In the summer of 2014, Baum was hired as youth coach at FC Augsburg. On 14 December 2016 he was promoted to the first team. He was sacked on 9 April 2019.

On 21 June 2019, Baum joined the DFB as head coach of the Germany under-20s. He also had a brief stint in charge of the under-18s in 2020.

On 30 September 2020, Baum signed a two-year contract with Schalke 04. After Schalke could not win any of ten Bundesliga games with him, he was fired on 18 December 2020.

Managerial statistics

References

External links

1979 births
Living people
German footballers
German football managers
SpVgg Unterhaching managers
Association football goalkeepers
3. Liga managers
FC Augsburg managers
FC Schalke 04 managers
Bundesliga managers
Sportspeople from Landshut
Footballers from Bavaria